Project Oxygen is a research project at the Massachusetts Institute of Technology's Computer Science and Artificial Intelligence Laboratory to develop pervasive, human-centered computing.  The Oxygen architecture is to consist of handheld terminals, computers embedded in the environment, and dynamically configured networks which connect these devices.

References

External links
 MIT Project Oxygen

Massachusetts Institute of Technology
Usability